Shams (Arabic: شمس; Sun) was a Saudi Arabian daily newspaper published between 2005 and 2012. Its publisher described the paper as modern and trendy.

History and profile
Shams was launched as a tabloid paper in December 2005. Turki bin Khalid bin Faisal, a grandson of Sultan bin Abdulaziz Al Saud, was the chairman of the board of directors of Shams Information Company for Publishing and Development. It was also reported that he partly owned the paper. Al Wataniya group was also the founder of the daily.

There is inconsistent information about the daily print of Shams. The media group publishing the paper gave the number of daily print as 120,000. Committee to Protect Journalists (CPJ), on the other hand, in its 2006 report described Shams as a modest paper with the daily circulation of 40,000 copies. The Group Plus stated the daily circulation as over 70,000 copies. Shams was staffed mainly by Saudi journalists. and was being printed in Riyadh, Dammam and Jeddah.

The daily was the first paper in Saudi Arabia addressing at large youth population. Specifically, it targeted male and female Saudi readers between the ages of 18 to 35 who are interested in modern life-style, but also loyal to Saudi Arabia's conventional customs.

Shams mostly covered general local Saudi news and other top news from the world. The content of the paper was varied and insightful, ranging from political news and social issues to business news, and various international and local sports news. It also featured the latest Internet and technology updates, fashion, university topics, cars, and various other entertainment topics. It also attempted to cover the opinions and interests of today's younger generation.

Controversy
See also; Jyllands-Posten Muhammad cartoons controversy
The publication of the Shams was suspended on 20 February 2006 after publishing one of the controversial cartoons of the Prophet Mohammad that caused anger across the Muslim world due to their publication in the Danish daily Jyllands-Posten on 30 September 2005. In fact, this cartoon was printed in Shams next to the articles calling for Saudis to take action against Denmark where the cartoons first published. The paper stated that the cartoon was published to initiate a campaign in Saudi Arabia against Danish interests and Denmark.

On 21 March 2006, Shams was relaunched. However, its 32-year-old editor Battal Koss was dismissed in late February 2006 and replaced by Khalaf Harby.

Closure
At the beginning of February 2012, Shams was closed down due to the conditions beyond its management.

References

2005 establishments in Saudi Arabia
2012 disestablishments in Saudi Arabia
Arabic-language newspapers
Censorship in Saudi Arabia
Defunct newspapers published in Saudi Arabia
Jyllands-Posten Muhammad cartoons controversy
Mass media in Riyadh
Newspapers established in 2005
Publications disestablished in 2012